Fredrik Johan Wiik, also known as F.J. Wiik, (16 December 1839 in Helsinki – 15 June 1909 in Helsinki) was a Finnish geologist and mineralogist; in 1877, he was named the first professor of geology and mineralogy at the Imperial Alexander University of Finland, where his students included Jakob Sederholm and Wilhelm Ramsay. He was also the first scientist in Finland to use a petrographic microscope.

Wiik died in 1909, on a geological expedition; his body was found clutching his geologist's hammer.

The mineral wiikite is named for him.

Personal life
Wiik was the son of noted Finnish architect Jean Wik.

References

1839 births
1909 deaths
Members of the Finnish Academy of Science and Letters
Scientists from Helsinki
Finnish geologists